Ronald L. Huntley is a retired United States Air Force brigadier general. He has been the vice president for national security space at Peraton since May 2021. Before retiring from the Air Force in March 2016, he served as the director of financial management and comptroller at the Air Force Space Command.

References

External links
 

Year of birth missing (living people)
Living people
Place of birth missing (living people)
United States Air Force generals